This article lists the largest companies in Spain in terms of their revenue, net profit and total assets, according to the American business magazines Fortune and Forbes.

2019 Fortune list 
This list displays all 9 Spanish companies in the Fortune Global 500, which ranks the world's largest companies by annual revenue. The figures below are given in millions of US dollars and are for the fiscal year 2018. Also listed are the headquarters location, net profit, number of employees worldwide and industry sector of each company.

2019 Forbes list 

This list is based on the Forbes Global 2000, which ranks the world's 2,000 largest publicly traded companies. The Forbes list takes into account a multitude of factors, including the revenue, net profit, total assets and market value of each company; each factor is given a weighted rank in terms of importance when considering the overall ranking. The table below also lists the headquarters location and industry sector of each company. The figures are in USD billions and are for the year 2019. All 21 companies from Spain are listed.

2019 El Economista national list 

El Economista is the biggest financial newspaper based in Spain. The list is ordered by the national (only national) income based on the annual updated list comprised by 500.000 different Spanish companies.

See also 
List of companies of Spain
List of largest companies by revenue

References 

Spain
companies